My Dear Heart is a 2017 Philippine fantasy drama television series directed by Jerome Pobocan and Jojo Saguin, starring Nayomi "Heart" Ramos, Coney Reyes, Zanjoe Marudo and Bela Padilla. The series premiered on ABS-CBN's Primetime Bida evening block and worldwide on The Filipino Channel on January 23, 2017 to June 16, 2017 replacing Till I Met You.

Series overview

Episodes

References

Lists of Philippine drama television series episodes
Lists of fantasy television series episodes
Lists of children's television series episodes
2010s television-related lists